Scrap Heaven is a 2005 film, directed by Sang-il Lee. The movie was theatrically released to Japan in the year 2005. It was later released to the stores of North America in the year 2007.

Plot
A pharmacist, police officer, and a toilet cleaner are riding a bus on a fateful night. The trio share a bizarre and tragic, life-altering experience when the bus becomes hijacked by a terrorist. The terrorist forces the three into a violent game of Rock, Paper, Scissors and Russian roulette, which toilet cleaner Testsu loses. The terrorist then shoots Tetsu, causing the bus to make a sudden stop. After noticing that pharmacist Saki has only one eye, the terrorist suddenly feels remorse and finally turns the weapon on himself. The tragic bus ride leaves police officer Shingo feeling humiliated and ashamed of himself, for not handling the bus hijacking.

Several months later, Shingo meets  Tetsu again. After being humiliated in the police force, and saving Tetsu from the yakuza, the two decides to get revenge on society by starting a revenge-for-hire operation. By scribbling on bathroom walls to advertise their business, Shingo and Tetsu offer their services to anyone with a problem. Meanwhile, the pharmacist Saki, also affected by the hijacking becomes disillusioned and anti-social. She begins to plot her own ways of getting revenge on society by constructing a liquid bomb.

Cast
Ryō Kase as Police Officer Shingo
Joe Odagiri as Toilet Cleaner Tetsu
Chiaki Kuriyama as Pharmacist Saki
Akira Emoto
Ken Mitsuishi

References

External links
 

2005 films
2000s Japanese-language films
Films directed by Sang-il Lee
2000s Japanese films